Ioffe is a Jewish surname.

Ioffe may also refer to:

Akademik Ioffe, Soviet/Russian research vessel
5222 Ioffe, main-belt asteroid
Ioffe (crater), moon crater
Ioffe Institute, Russia